Irma “Butterfly” Testa (born 28 December 1997) is an Italian boxer.  She competed at the 2016 Summer Olympics, and won the bronze medal in the women's featherweight event at the 2020 Summer Olympics.

In 2021 she came out as queer.

References

External links
 

1997 births
Living people
Italian women boxers
Olympic boxers of Italy
AIBA Women's World Boxing Championships medalists
Boxers at the 2016 Summer Olympics
Boxers at the 2020 Summer Olympics
Boxers at the 2014 Summer Youth Olympics
European Games competitors for Italy
Boxers at the 2019 European Games
Lightweight boxers
Medalists at the 2020 Summer Olympics
Olympic bronze medalists for Italy
Olympic medalists in boxing
People from Torre Annunziata

Italian LGBT sportspeople
LGBT boxers
Sportspeople from the Province of Naples
21st-century Italian women